This is a list of number-one albums by New Zealand artists in New Zealand from the Official New Zealand Music Chart albums chart.

List 

Key
 – Number-one single of the year.
 – Number-one single of the year, of New Zealand origin.
{| class="wikitable sortable"
|- bgcolor="#CCCCCC"
! Reachednumber one
! Title
! Artist
! Weeks atnumber one
|-
| 5 March 1976
| Bill & Boyd
| Bill & Boyd
| align="center" | 1 
|-
| 19 November 1976
| The World's Great Classics
| New Zealand Symphony Orchestra
| align="center" | 1 
|-  bgcolor="#dfdfdf" 
| 2 March 1980
| True Colours
| Split Enz
| align="center" | 3
|- 
| 8 June 1980
| Space Race
| Mi-Sex
| align="center" | 4
|-  bgcolor="#dfdfdf" 
| 19 April 1981
| Waiata
| Split Enz
| align="center" | 3
|-  
| 25 April 1982
| Cool Bananas
| DD Smash
| align="center" | 1
|-  bgcolor="#dfdfdf" 
| 2 May 1982
| Time and Tide
| Split Enz
| align="center" | 6
|- 
| 23 January 1983
| Enz of an Era
| Split Enz
| align="center" | 2
|- bgcolor="#dfdfdf" 
| 21 August 1983
| Escapade
| Tim Finn
| align="center" | 1
|- bgcolor="#dfdfdf" 
| 10 September 1989
| Piano by Candlelight II
| Carl Doy
| align="center" | 4
|- 
| 24 June 1990
| Submarine Bells
| The Chills
| align="center" | 2
|- 
| 2 September 1990
| Together Again
| Gray Bartlett, Jodi Vaughan, Brendan Dugan
| align="center" | 1 
|- bgcolor="#dfdfdf" 
| 30 September 1990
| Moonlight Sax
| Brian Smith
| align="center" | 3
|-
| 22 March 1992
| Something Beginning with C
| The Exponents
| align="center" | 2
|- bgcolor="#dfdfdf" 
| 26 April 1992
| Woodface
| Crowded House
| align="center" | 4
|- 
| 21 November 1993
| Together Alone
| Crowded House
| align="center" | 1
|- bgcolor="#dfdfdf" 
| 17 July 1994
| Traction
| Supergroove
| align="center" | 4
|- 
| 14 January 1996
| Once Bitten, Twice Bitten: The Singles 1981–1995
| The Exponents
| align="center" | 1
|- bgcolor="#dfdfdf" 
| 14 July 1996
| Recurring Dream: The Very Best of Crowded House
| Crowded House
| align="center" | 8
|- bgcolor="#dfdfdf" 
| 10 August 1997
| Drive
| Bic Runga
| align="center" | 3
|- 
| 28 June 1998
| Try Whistling This
| Neil Finn
| align="center" | 3
|- 
| 23 August 1998
| The Islander
| Dave Dobbyn
| align="center" | 1 
|- bgcolor="#dfdfdf" 
| 6 September 1998
| Supersystem
| The Feelers
| align="center" | 1
|- 
| 13 September 1998
| Espresso Guitar
| Martin Winch
| align="center" | 3
|- 
| 27 June 1999
| Dream
| TrueBliss
| align="center" | 1
|- 
| 26 September 1999
| Mix
| Stellar
| align="center" | 1
|- 
| 10 October 1999
| The General Electric
| Shihad
| align="center" | 1
|- 
| 27 August 2000
| Silencer
| Zed
| align="center" | 2
|- 
| 1 April 2001
| One Nil
| Neil Finn
| align="center" | 1
|- bgcolor="#dfdfdf" 
| 20 May 2001
| Hayley Westenra†
| Hayley Westenra
| align="center" | 4
|-  bgcolor="#dfdfdf"
| 26 August 2001
| Inside the Dub Plates†
| Salmonella Dub
| align="center" | 1
|- 
| 16 September 2001
| Navigator
| Che Fu
| align="center" | 3 
|- 
| 14 October 2001
| Thinking Room
| Anika Moa
| align="center" | 2
|- 
| 28 October 2001
| Communicate
| The Feelers
| align="center" | 1 
|- 
| 4 November 2001
| Magic Line
| Stellar
| align="center" | 1 
|- 
| 27 January 2002
| Listen: The Very Best Of
| The Herbs
| align="center" | 1
|-  bgcolor="#ffffcc"
| 14 July 2002
| Beautiful Collision‡
| Bic Runga
| align="center" | 8
|- 
| 1 September 2002
| Pacifier
| Pacifier
| align="center" | 1
|- 
| 3 November 2002
| The Datsuns
| The Datsuns
| align="center" | 1
|- 
| 10 November 2002
| Blindspott
| Blindspott
| align="center" | 2
|- 
| 8 December 2002
| Polysaturated
| Nesian Mystik
| align="center" | 1
|- 
| 20 July 2003
| Love & Disrespect
| Elemeno P
| align="center" | 1
|- 
| 3 August 2003
| Pure
| Hayley Westenra
| align="center" |20
|- 
| 31 August 2003
| One Drop East
| Salmonella Dub
| align="center" | 1 
|- 
| 2 November 2003
| The Crusader
| Scribe
| align="center" | 1
|-  bgcolor="#ffffcc"
| 16 November 2003
| What to Do with Daylight‡
| Brooke Fraser
| align="center" | 3
|- 
| 17 May 2004
| Always and for Real
| Adeaze
| align="center" | 1
|- 
| 21 June 2004
| One Road
| Ben Lummis
| align="center" | 2
|- 
| 2 August 2004
| Riverhead
| Goldenhorse
| align="center" | 3
|- 
| 30 August 2004
| Everyone Is Here
| Finn Brothers
| align="center" | 3
|- 
| 20 September 2004
| Into the West
| Yulia
| align="center" | 4
|-   bgcolor="#ffffcc"
| 9 May 2005
| Based on a True Story‡
| Fat Freddy's Drop
| align="center" | 10 
|- 
| 15 August 2005
| Odyssey
| Hayley Westenra
| align="center" | 2
|- 
| 5 December 2005
| Birds
| Bic Runga
| align="center" | 1
|- 
| 10 April 2006
| Montage
| Yulia
| align="center" | 1
|- 
| 5 June 2006
| End The Silence
| Blindspott
| align="center" | 1
|- 
| 24 July 2006
| Into the Dojo
| The Black Seeds
| align="center" | 5
|- 
| 20 November 2006
| One World
| The Feelers
| align="center" | 1
|- 
| 11 December 2006
| Albertine
| Brooke Fraser
| align="center" | 1
|-  bgcolor="#dfdfdf"
| 26 March 2007
| Treasure†
| Hayley Westenra
| align="center" | 5
|- 
| 4 June 2007
| Long Player
| Hollie Smith
| align="center" | 2
|- 
| 22 October 2007
| Kora
| Kora
| align="center" | 1
|- 
| 29 October 2007
| Outrageous Fortune: Westside Rules
| Various artists
| align="center" | 1
|- 
| 6 January 2008
| Second Hand Planet
| Opshop
| align="center" | 3
|- 
| 28 April 2008
| Beautiful Machine
| Shihad
| align="center" | 1
|- 
| 5 May 2008
| Flight of the Conchords
| Flight of the Conchords
| align="center" | 1
|- 
| 17 November 2008
| The Best: 1998–2008
| The Feelers
| align="center" | 2
|-  bgcolor="#ffffcc"
| 15 December 2008
| The Comic Genius of Billy T. James‡
| Billy T. James
| align="center" | 6
|- 
| 1 June 2009
| Dr Boondigga and the Big BW
| Fat Freddy's Drop
| align="center" | 5
|- 
| 24 August 2009
| A Story
| Fly My Pretties
| align="center" | 1
|- 
| 19 October 2009
| Ladyhawke: Collector's Edition
| Ladyhawke
| align="center" | 1 
|-  bgcolor="#dfdfdf"
| 26 October 2009
| Holy Smoke†
| Gin Wigmore
| align="center" | 5
|- 
| 16 November 2009
| The System Is a Vampire
| Shapeshifter
| align="center" | 2
|- 
| 22 March 2010
| Humour and the Misfortune of Others
| Hollie Smith
| align="center" | 1
|- 
| 5 April 2010
| The Experiment
| Dane Rumble
| align="center" | 1
|- 
| 9 August 2010
| Until the End of Time
| Opshop
| align="center" | 1
|- 
| 30 August 2010
| From the Inside Out
| Stan Walker
| align="center" | 1
|- 
| 13 September 2010
| Passive Me, Aggressive You
| The Naked and Famous
| align="center" | 1
|- 
| 27 September 2010
| Ignite
| Shihad
| align="center" | 1
|- 
| 18 October 2010
| Flags
| Brooke Fraser
| align="center" | 1
|- 
| 21 February 2011
| Island Vibration
| House of Shem
| align="center" | 1
|- 
| 14 March 2011
| In the World of Light
| Tiki
| align="center" | 1
|- 
| 4 April 2011
| Maori Songbook
| Dennis Marsh
| align="center" | 1
|- 
| 9 May 2011
| Paradiso
| Hayley Westenra
| align="center" | 1
|-  bgcolor="#dfdfdf"
| 17 October 2011
| Six60†
| Six60
| align="center" | 2
|- 
| 14 November 2011
|Gravel & Wine
|Gin Wigmore
| align="center" | 2
|- 
| 16 April 2012
| Dust and Dirt
| The Black Seeds
| align="center" | 1
|- 
| 7 May 2012
| Home Brew
| Home Brew
| align="center" | 1
|- 
| 6 August 2012
| White Rabbit: The Very Best of Peter Posa
| Peter Posa
| align="center" | 6
|- 
| 18 February 2013
| Mt. Zion
| Various Artists
| align="center" | 1
|- 
| 10 June 2013
| Delta
| Shapeshifter
| align="center" | 1
|- 
| 1 July 2013
| Blackbird
| Fat Freddy's Drop
| align="center" | 4
|- 
| 5 August 2013
| Country Songbook
| Dennis Marsh
| align="center" | 1
|- 
| 19 August 2013
| Jackie Thomas
| Jackie Thomas
| align="center" | 2
|- 
| 23 September 2013
| Blacklistt
| Blacklistt
| align="center" | 2
|- 
| 7 October 2013
| Pure Heroine
| Lorde
| align="center" | 8
|- bgcolor="#ffffcc"
| 25 November 2013
| Sol3 Mio‡
| Sol3 Mio
| align="center" | 9
|-
| 21 July 2014
| We Rise
| Devilskin
| align="center" | 3
|-
| 18 August 2014
| FVEY
| Shihad
| align="center" | 1
|-
| 1 September 2014
| Evergreen
| Broods
| align="center" | 1
|-
| 9 March 2015
| Six60
| Six60
| align="center" | 3
|-
| 6 April 2015
| Lest We Forget
| Dennis Marsh
| align="center" | 1
|-
| 6 July 2015
| Blood to Bone
| Gin Wigmore
| align="center" | 1
|-
| 13 July 2015
| The Quin Tikis: New Zealand's Premier Maori Show Band
| The Quin Tikis
| align="center" | 2
|-
| 2 November 2015
|Bays
|Fat Freddy's Drop
| align="center" | 1
|-
| 21 March 2016
|On Another Note
|Sol3 Mio
| align="center" | 1
|-
| 11 April 2016
|Water or Gold
|Hollie Smith
| align="center" | 1
|-
| 25 April 2016
|Songs for Bubbas 2
|Anika Moa
| align="center" | 1
|-
| 4 July 2016
|Conscious
|Broods
| align="center" | 4
|-
|1 August 2016
|Brown Girl
|Aaradhna
| align="center" | 1
|-
|7 November 2016
|Meant to Be
|The Koi Boys
| align="center" | 1
|-
|14 November 2016
|E Ipo: The Very Best Of
|Prince Tui Teka
| align="center" | 1
|-
|21 November 2016
|Be Like the River
|Devilskin
| align="center" | 1
|-
| 23 June 2017
| Melodrama
| Lorde
| align="center" | 3
|-
|4 December 2017
|A Very M3rry Christmas
|Sol3 Mio
|align="center" | 4
|-
|5 February 2018
|"BBQ" Reggae|Tomorrow People
|align="center" | 1
|-
|26 February 2018
|Make Way for Love
|Marlon Williams
|align="center" | 1
|-
|8 July 2019
|IV
|Beastwars
|align="center" | 1
|-
|18 November 2019
|SIX60 (3)
|SIX60
|align="center" | 28
|-
|28 December 2020
|L.A.B. IV
|L.A.B.
|align="center" | 5
|-
|}Notes New Zealand albums with the most weeks at #1 28 weeks SIX60 (3) - SIX6020 weeks Pure - Hayley Westenra10 weeks Based on a True Story - Fat Freddy's Drop9 weeks Sol3 Mio - Sol3 Mio8 weeks Pure Heroine - Lorde
 Recurring Dream: The Very Best of Crowded House - Crowded House
 Beautiful Collision - Bic Runga6 weeks Time and Tide - Split Enz
 The Comic Genius of Billy T. James - Billy T. James
 White Rabbit: The Very Best of Peter Posa - Peter Posa5 weeks' Into the Dojo - The Black Seeds
 Treasure - Hayley Westenra
 Dr Boondigga and the Big BW - Fat Freddy's Drop
 Holy Smoke - Gin Wigmore
 L.A.B. IV'' - L.A.B.

New Zealand artists with the most number-one albums 

 Hayley Westenra (5) 
 Split Enz (4) 
 The Feelers (4) 
 Gin Wigmore (3) 
 Bic Runga (3) 
 Brooke Fraser (3) 
 Crowded House (3)  
 Fat Freddy's Drop (3) 
 Shihad (3)

References

External links
 The Official NZ Music Charts – albums (Recorded Music NZ)
 Charts.org.nz – album charts (Hung Medien)

New Zealand music-related lists
Lists of number-one albums in New Zealand